Banes is a municipality and city in the Holguín Province of Cuba. Banes was an important area for the native Taino people before the conquest by Columbus.

The town of Banes is visited by tourists from Guardalavaca as it is the nearest town to the resort, and both are in the municipality of Banes. A museum featuring the Taino culture is situated halfway between both towns.

History
The name comes from the inhabitants Taino language word Bani, meaning "valley".

Hurricane Ike made landfall here as a Category 4 hurricane on the evening of September 7, 2008, causing great losses of property.

Geography
The municipality is divided into the barrios of Barrio Amarillo, Angeles, Berros, Cañadón, Durruthy, Este, Flores, Macabi, Mulas, Nuevo Banes, Oeste, Retrete, Río Seco, Samá (includes Guardalavaca), Marcané, Veguitas and Yaguajay.

Demographics
In 2004, the municipality of Banes had a population of 81,274.

Personalities
Fulgencio Batista (1901–1973), politician
Victor Brown (?–2016), musician
Rafael Díaz-Balart (1926–2005), politician
Rafael José Díaz-Balart (1899–1985), politician
Waldo Díaz-Balart (b. 1931), painter
Julio González (1920–1991), baseball player
Peruchín (1913–1977), pianist
Gilberto Zaldívar (1934–2009), Cuban-American theatre director

See also
Municipalities of Cuba
List of cities in Cuba

References

External links

 
Cities in Cuba
Populated places in Holguín Province